The Sealed Secret is a 2013 film by the Iranian director Hadi Moghadamdoost. Moghadamdoost also co-wrote the script with Hamid Nematollah and Rouzbeh Raiga. The film starred Khatereh Asadi, Leila Hatami and Arash Majidi.

References

External links
 

Iranian drama films
2010s Persian-language films
2013 films